Rowing at the 2020 Summer Paralympics in Tokyo, Japan, took place at the Sea Forest Waterway, the same location as the paracanoeing events are located. There were 96 qualified slots across four events (one male, one female, two mixed events); there were two singles events (1 male, 1 female), mixed doubles and mixed fours.

The 2020 Summer Olympic and Paralympic Games were postponed to 2021 due to the COVID-19 pandemic. They kept the 2020 name and were held from 24 August to 5 September 2021.

Qualification
An NPC can only allocate one boat per medal event with a maximum of four male or female rowers (excluding coxswains).

Medal summary

Medal table

Medalists

See also
Rowing at the 2020 Summer Olympics

References

External links
Results book 

2020 Summer Paralympics events
Rowing competitions in Japan
Paralympics
2020